Darvish-e Gurnamaz (also Romanized as Darvīsh-e Gūrnamāz; also known as Darvīsh Garīmaz and Darvish Gūrūnmaz) is a village in Azadlu Rural District, Muran District, Germi County, Ardabil Province, Iran. At the 2006 census, its population was 201, in 43 families.

References 

Towns and villages in Germi County